Covers is Japanese singer songwriter Fayray's sixth studio album and her only cover album, released June 8, 2005.

Track listing

Charts and sales

References

External links

2005 albums
Covers albums
Fayray albums